The Romashkino field (Romaşkino neft' çığanağı) is an oil field in Tatarstan, Russia. Discovered in 1948, it is the largest oil field of Volga-Ural Basin. The field is operated by Tatneft.

However, advanced technologies allow for extraction of more oil.

Oil fields of Russia
Geography of Tatarstan
Oil fields of the Soviet Union